Dietrich II of Isenberg-Limburg died 22.3.1328. In deeds and charters known as Dietrich (II) of Limburg-Stirum. He was a German aristocrat, lord of Stirum and the son of Johann of Isenberg-Limburg who died in 1277. He should not be confused with Diederik II count of Limburg Hohenlimburg (±1276 - 09.08.1364) or Dietrich III count of Limburg Hohenlimburg and lord of Broich (±1328-18.05.1401) who actually ruled the county Limburg (Lenne).

He married Bertrada von Goetterswick and they had four children:

 Johann of Limburg, gt of Stirum (died before 1364);
 Dietrich IV of Limburg, gt von Stirum;
 Agnes (died after 1342).
 Guda, married to Heinrich Wolf von Ludinghausen.

Literature
 Genealogische Handbuch des Adels, Gräfliche Häuser A Band II, 1955; (outdated)
 W. Gf v. Limburg Stirum, "Stamtafel der Graven van Limburg Stirum", 's Gravenhage 1878; (outdated)

References
 Berg, A. 1964. [German] Archive fur Sippenforschung Heft 14. Jahrgang 30. Mai 1964
 Korteweg, K.N. 1964.[Dutch] De Nederlandse Leeuw Jaargang LXXXI no.8 August 1964.
 Bleicher, W. 1993 [German] Monatsschrift des Vereins für Orts- und Heimatkunde Hohenlimburg “Geschichte der Grafschaft Limburg”. Hohenlimburger Heimatblätter. Jg., 1993 Heft Mai.
 

Counts of Germany
House of Berg
House of Limburg-Stirum
13th-century births
1300s deaths